Turzyn is a municipal neighbourhood of the city of Szczecin, Poland situated on the left bank of Oder river, west of the Szczecin Old Town and Middle Town. As of January 2011 it had a population of 20,373.

History 

Before 1945 when Stettin was a part of Germany, the German name of this suburb was Stettin-Torney.

Aleksander Wolszczan attended a school in Turzyn(VI Liceum Ogólnokształcące).

References 

Turzyn